Sateh Abdelnasser (born 11 September 1993) is a  Qatari footballer. He currently plays for Al Arabi.

External links

References

Qatari footballers
1993 births
Living people
Al Ahli SC (Doha) players
Al-Arabi SC (Qatar) players
Qatari people of Syrian descent
Naturalised citizens of Qatar
Qatar SC players
Qatar Stars League players
Association football goalkeepers
Qatar youth international footballers